

Events

Pre-1600
 613 – Eight-month-old Constantine is crowned as co-emperor (Caesar) by his father Heraclius at Constantinople.
 871 – Battle of Basing: The West Saxons led by King Æthelred I are defeated by the Danelaw Vikings at Basing.
1506 – The first contingent of 150 Swiss Guards arrives at the Vatican.
1517 – The Ottoman Empire under Selim I defeats the Mamluk Sultanate and captures present-day Egypt at the Battle of Ridaniya.
1555 – The Ava Kingdom falls to the Taungoo Dynasty in what is now Myanmar.

1601–1900
1689 – The Convention Parliament convenes to determine whether James II and VII, the last Roman Catholic monarch of England, Ireland and Scotland, had vacated the thrones of England and Ireland when he fled to France in 1688.
1808 – The Portuguese royal family arrives in Brazil after fleeing the French army's invasion of Portugal two months earlier.
1824 – The Ashantis defeat British forces in the Gold Coast.
1849 – Second Anglo-Sikh War: The Siege of Multan ends after nine months when the last Sikh defenders of Multan, Punjab, surrender.
1863 – The January Uprising breaks out in Poland, Lithuania and Belarus. The aim of the national movement is to regain Polish–Lithuanian–Ruthenian Commonwealth from occupation by Russia.
1879 – The Battle of Isandlwana during the Anglo-Zulu War results in a British defeat.
1890 – The United Mine Workers of America is founded in Columbus, Ohio.

1901–present
1901 – Edward VII is proclaimed King of the United Kingdom after the death of his mother, Queen Victoria.
1905 – Bloody Sunday in Saint Petersburg, beginning of the 1905 revolution.
1906 –  runs aground on rocks on Vancouver Island, British Columbia, killing more than 130.
1915 – Over 600 people are killed in Guadalajara, Mexico, when a train plunges off the tracks into a deep canyon.
1917 – American entry into World War I: President Woodrow Wilson of the still-neutral United States calls for "peace without victory" in Europe.
1919 – Act Zluky is signed, unifying the Ukrainian People's Republic and the West Ukrainian National Republic.
1924 – Ramsay MacDonald becomes the first Labour Prime Minister of the United Kingdom.
1927 – Teddy Wakelam gives the first live radio commentary of a football match, between Arsenal F.C. and Sheffield United at Highbury.
1941 – World War II: British and Commonwealth troops capture Tobruk from Italian forces during Operation Compass.
1943 – World War II: Australian and American forces defeat Japanese army and navy units in the bitterly fought Battle of Buna–Gona.
1944 – World War II: The Allies commence Operation Shingle, an assault on Anzio and Nettuno, Italy.
1946 – In Iran, Qazi Muhammad declares the independent people's Republic of Mahabad at Chahar Cheragh Square in the Kurdish city of Mahabad; he becomes the new president and Haji Baba Sheikh becomes the prime minister.
  1946   – Creation of the Central Intelligence Group, forerunner of the Central Intelligence Agency.
1947 – KTLA, the first commercial television station west of the Mississippi River, begins operation in Hollywood.
1957 – Israel withdraws from the Sinai Peninsula.
  1957   – The New York City "Mad Bomber", George P. Metesky, is arrested in Waterbury, Connecticut and charged with planting more than 30 bombs.
1963 – The Élysée Treaty of cooperation between France and West Germany is signed by Charles de Gaulle and Konrad Adenauer.
1967 – Between dozens and hundreds of anti-Somocista demonstrators are killed by the Nicaraguan National Guard in Managua.
1968 – Apollo 5 lifts off carrying the first Lunar module into space.
  1968   – Operation Igloo White, a US electronic surveillance system to stop communist infiltration into South Vietnam begins installation.
1970 – The Boeing 747, the world's first "jumbo jet", enters commercial service for launch customer Pan American Airways with its maiden voyage from New York's John F. Kennedy International Airport to London Heathrow Airport.
1971 – The Singapore Declaration, one of the two most important documents to the uncodified constitution of the Commonwealth of Nations, is issued.
1973 – The Supreme Court of the United States delivers its decisions in Roe v. Wade and Doe v. Bolton, legalizing elective abortion in all fifty states.
  1973   – The crew of Apollo 17 addresses a joint session of Congress after the completion of the final Apollo moon landing mission.
  1973   – A chartered Boeing 707 explodes in flames upon landing at Kano Airport, Nigeria, killing 176.
  1973   – In a bout for the world heavyweight boxing championship in Kingston, Jamaica, challenger George Foreman knocks down champion Joe Frazier six times in the first two rounds before the fight is stopped by referee Arthur Mercante.
1984 – The Apple Macintosh, the first consumer computer to popularize the computer mouse and the graphical user interface, is introduced during a Super Bowl XVIII television commercial.
1987 – Philippine security forces open fire on a crowd of 10,000–15,000 demonstrators at Malacañang Palace, Manila, killing 13.
1992 – Rebel forces occupy Zaire's national radio station in Kinshasa and broadcast a demand for the government's resignation.
  1992   – Space Shuttle program: The space shuttle Discovery launches on STS-42 carrying Dr. Roberta Bondar, who becomes the first Canadian woman and the first neurologist in space.
1995 – Israeli–Palestinian conflict: Beit Lid suicide bombing: In central Israel, near Netanya, two Gazans blow themselves up at a military transit point, killing 19 Israeli soldiers.
1998 – Space Shuttle program: space shuttle Endeavour launches on STS-89 to dock with the Russian space station Mir.
1999 – Australian missionary Graham Staines and his two sons are burned alive by radical Hindus while sleeping in their car in Eastern India.
2002 – Kmart becomes the largest retailer in United States history to file for Chapter 11 bankruptcy protection.
2006 – Evo Morales is inaugurated as President of Bolivia, becoming the country's first indigenous president.
2007 – At least 88 people are killed when two car bombs explode in the Bab Al-Sharqi market in central Baghdad, Iraq.
2009 – President Barack Obama signs an executive order to close the Guantanamo Bay detention camp; congressional opposition will prevent it being implemented.

Births

Pre-1600
1263 – Ibn Taymiyyah, Syrian scholar and theologian (d. 1328)
1440 – Ivan III of Russia (d. 1505)
1522 – Charles II de Valois, Duke of Orléans, (d. 1545)
1552 – Walter Raleigh, English poet, soldier, courtier, and explorer (d. 1618)
1561 – Francis Bacon, English philosopher and politician, Attorney General for England and Wales (d. 1626)
1570 – Sir Robert Cotton, 1st Baronet, of Connington, English historian and politician, founded the Cotton library (d. 1631)
1573 – John Donne, English poet and cleric in the Church of England, wrote the Holy Sonnets (d. 1631)
1592 – Pierre Gassendi, French mathematician, astronomer, and philosopher (d. 1655)

1601–1900
1645 – William Kidd, Scottish sailor and pirate hunter (probable; d. 1701)
1654 – Richard Blackmore, English physician and poet (d. 1729)
1690 – Nicolas Lancret, French painter (d. 1743)
1729 – Gotthold Ephraim Lessing, German philosopher and author (d. 1781)
1733 – Philip Carteret, English admiral and explorer (d. 1796)
1740 – Noah Phelps, American soldier, lawyer, and judge (d. 1809)
1781 – François Habeneck, French violinist and conductor (d. 1849)
1788 – Lord Byron, English poet and playwright (d. 1824)
1792 – Lady Lucy Whitmore, English noblewoman, hymn writer (d. 1840)
1796 – Karl Ernst Claus, Estonian-Russian chemist, botanist, and academic (d. 1864)
1797 – Maria Leopoldina of Austria (d. 1826)
1799 – Ludger Duvernay, Canadian journalist, publisher, and politician (d. 1852)
1802 – Richard Upjohn, English-American architect (d. 1878)
1828 – Dayrolles Eveleigh-de-Moleyns, 4th Baron Ventry, Irish hereditary peer (d. 1914)
1831 – Prince Christian of Schleswig-Holstein (d. 1917)
1840 – Ernest Wilberforce, English bishop (d. 1907)
1849 – August Strindberg, Swedish novelist, poet, and playwright (d. 1912)
1858 – Beatrice Webb, English sociologist and economist (d. 1943) 
1861 – George Fuller, Australian politician, 22nd Premier of New South Wales (d. 1940)
1865 – Wilbur Scoville, American chemist and pharmacist (d. 1942)
1867 – Gisela Januszewska, Jewish-Austrian physician (d. 1943)
1869 – José Vicente de Freitas, Portuguese colonel and politician, 97th Prime Minister of Portugal (d. 1952)
1874 – Edward Harkness, American philanthropist (d. 1940)
  1874   – Jay Hughes, American baseball player and coach (d. 1924)
1875 – D. W. Griffith, American director, producer, and screenwriter (d. 1948)
1877 – Tom Jones, American baseball player and manager (d. 1923)
1879 – Francis Picabia, French painter and poet (d. 1953)
1880 – Bill O'Neill, Canadian-American baseball player (d. 1920)
  1880   – Frigyes Riesz, Hungarian mathematician and academic (d. 1956)
1881 – Ira Thomas, American baseball player and manager (d. 1958)
1886 – John J. Becker, American pianist, composer, and conductor (d. 1961)
1887 – Helen Hoyt, American poet and author (d. 1972)
1889 – Henri Pélissier, French cyclist (d. 1935)
  1889   – Amos Strunk, American baseball player and manager (d. 1979)
1890 – Fred M. Vinson, American judge and politician, 13th Chief Justice of the United States (d. 1953)
1891 – Antonio Gramsci, Italian philosopher and politician (d. 1937)
1892 – Marcel Dassault, French businessman, founded Dassault Aviation (d. 1986)
1893 – Conrad Veidt, German-American actor, director, and producer (d. 1943)
1897 – Rosa Ponselle, American operatic soprano (d. 1981)
  1897   – Dilipkumar Roy, a Bengali Indian musician, musicologist, novelist, poet and essayist. (d. 1980)
1898 – Ross Barnett, American lawyer and politician, 52nd Governor of Mississippi (d. 1987)
  1898   – Sergei Eisenstein, Russian director and screenwriter (d. 1948)
  1898   – Denise Legeay, French actress (d. 1968)
1899 – Martti Haavio, Finnish poet and mythologist (d. 1973)
1900 – Ernst Busch, German actor and singer (d. 1980)

1901–present
1902 – Daniel Kinsey, American hurdler, coach, and academic (d. 1970)
1903 – Fritz Houtermans, Polish-German physicist and academic (d. 1966)
1904 – George Balanchine, Georgian-American dancer, choreographer, and director, co-founded the New York City Ballet (d. 1983)
  1904   – Arkady Gaidar, Russian journalist and author (d. 1941)
1905 – Willy Hartner, German physicist, historian, and academic (d. 1981)
1906 – Robert E. Howard, American author and poet (d. 1936)
1907 – Douglas Corrigan, American pilot and engineer (d. 1995)
  1907   – Dixie Dean, English footballer (d. 1980)
1908 – Lev Landau, Azerbaijani-Russian physicist and academic, Nobel Prize laureate (d. 1968)
  1908   – Prince Oana, American baseball player and manager (d. 1976)
1909 – Martha Norelius, Swedish-born American swimmer (d. 1955)
  1909   – Porfirio Rubirosa, Dominican racing driver, polo player, and diplomat (d. 1965)
  1909   – Ann Sothern, American actress and singer (d. 2001)
  1909   – U Thant, Burmese educator and diplomat, 3rd United Nations Secretary-General (d. 1974)
1911 – Bruno Kreisky, Austrian lawyer and politician, 22nd Chancellor of Austria (d. 1990)
1913 – Henry Bauchau, Belgian psychoanalyst and author (d. 2012)
  1913   – William Conway, Irish cardinal (d. 1977)
  1913   – Carl F. H. Henry, American theologian and publisher (d. 2003)
1914 – Dimitris Dragatakis, Greek violinist and composer (d. 2001)
1915 – Heinrich Albertz, German theologian and politician, Mayor of Berlin (d. 1993)
1916 – Bill Durnan, Canadian ice hockey player and coach (d. 1972)
  1916   – Henri Dutilleux, French pianist, composer, and educator (d. 2013)
  1916   – Harilal Upadhyay, Indian author, poet, and astrologist (d. 1994)
1918 – Elmer Lach, Canadian ice hockey player and coach (d. 2015)
1919 – Diomedes Olivo, Dominican baseball player and scout (d. 1977)
1920 – Irving Kristol, American journalist, author, and academic, founded The National Interest (d. 2009)
  1920   – Alf Ramsey, English footballer and coach (d. 1999)
1922 – Howard Moss, American poet, playwright and critic (d. 1987)
1923 – Diana Douglas, British-American actress (d. 2015)
1924 – J. J. Johnson, American trombonist and composer (d. 2001)
  1924   – Ján Chryzostom Korec, Slovak cardinal (d. 2015)
  1924   – Charles Lisanby, American production designer and art director (d. 2013)
1925 – Johnny Bucha, American baseball player (d. 1996)
  1925   – Bobby Young, American baseball player (d. 1985)
1927 – Lou Creekmur, American football player and sportscaster (d. 2009)
  1927   – Joe Perry, American footballer (d. 2011)
1928 – Yoshihiko Amino, Japanese historian, author, and academic (d. 2004)
1929 – Petr Eben, Czech composer, organist and choirmaster (d. 2007)
1930 – Mariví Bilbao, Spanish actress (d. 2013)
  1930   – Éamon de Buitléar, Irish accordion player and director (d. 2013)
  1930   – Daniel Camargo Barbosa, Colombian serial killer (d. 1994) 
1931 – Sam Cooke, American singer-songwriter (d. 1964)
  1931   – Galina Zybina, Russian shot putter and javelin thrower
1932 – Berthold Grünfeld, Norwegian psychiatrist and academic (d. 2007)
  1932   – Piper Laurie, American actress
1932 – Tom Fisher Railsback, American politician (d. 2020)
1933 – Yuri Chesnokov, Russian volleyball player and coach (d. 2010)
1934 – Vijay Anand, Indian actor, director, producer, and screenwriter (d. 2004)
  1934   – Bill Bixby, American actor and director (d. 1993)
1935 – Alexander Men, Russian priest and scholar (d. 1990)
1936 – Ong Teng Cheong, Singaporean architect and politician, 5th President of Singapore (d. 2002)
  1936   – Alan J. Heeger, American physicist and chemist, Nobel Prize laureate
1937 – Alma Delia Fuentes, Mexican actress (d. 2017)
  1937   – Edén Pastora, Nicaraguan politician (d. 2020)
  1937   – Joseph Wambaugh, American police officer and author
1938 – Peter Beard, Australian photographer and author (d. 2020)
  1938   – Joe Esposito, American author (d. 2016)
  1938   – Altair Gomes de Figueiredo, Brazilian footballer (d. 2019)
1939 – Jørgen Garde, Danish admiral (d. 1996)
  1939   – Alfredo Palacio, Ecuadoran physician and politician, President of Ecuador
  1939   – Luigi Simoni, Italian footballer and manager (d. 2020)
  1939   – J. C. Tremblay, Canadian ice hockey player and scout (d. 1994)
1940 – John Hurt, English actor (d. 2017)
  1940   – George Seifert, American football player and coach
  1940   – Gillian Shephard, English educator and politician, Secretary of State for Education
1941 – Jaan Kaplinski, Estonian poet, philosopher, and critic (d. 2021)
  1941   – Eugene Hasenfus, former United States Marine whose capture led to exposure of the Iran–Contra affair
1942 – Mimis Domazos, Greek footballer
1943 – Michael Spicer, English journalist and politician (d. 2019)
1944 – Khosrow Golsorkhi, Iranian journalist, poet, and activist (d. 1974)
  1944   – Uto Ughi, Italian violinist and conductor
1945 – Jophery Brown, American baseball player, actor, and stuntman (d. 2014)
  1945   – Christoph Schönborn, Austrian cardinal
  1945   – Alojz Uran, Slovenian archbishop (d. 2020)
1946 – Malcolm McLaren, English singer-songwriter and manager (d. 2010)
  1946   – Serge Savard, Canadian ice hockey player and manager
1947 – Vladimir Oravsky, Czech-Swedish author and director
1948 – Gilbert Levine, American conductor and academic
1949 – Mike Caldwell, American baseball player and coach
  1949   – J.P. Pennington, American country-rock singer-songwriter and guitarist
  1949   – Steve Perry, American singer-songwriter and producer
1950 – Paul Bew, Northern Irish historian and academic
  1950   – Frank Schade, American basketball player and coach
1951 – Ondrej Nepela, Slovak figure skater and coach (d. 1989)
  1951   – Leon Roberts, American baseball player and manager
1952 – Ramón Avilés, Puerto Rican-American baseball player (d. 2020)
1953 – Winfried Berkemeier, German footballer and manager
  1953   – Myung-whun Chung, South Korean pianist and conductor
  1953   – Jim Jarmusch, American director and screenwriter
1955 – Thomas David Jones, American captain, pilot, and astronaut
  1955   – Timothy R. Ferguson, American politician
1956 – Steve Riley, American drummer 
1957 – Mike Bossy, Canadian ice hockey player and sportscaster (d. 2022)
  1957   – Brian Dayett, American baseball player and manager
  1957   – Godfrey Thoma, Nauruan politician
  1957   – Francis Wheen, English journalist and author
1958 – Nikos Anastopoulos, Greek footballer and manager
  1958   – Filiz Koçali, Turkish journalist and politician
1959 – Linda Blair, American actress 
1960 – Michael Hutchence, Australian singer-songwriter (d. 1997)
1962 – Jimmy Herring, American guitarist
  1962   – Mizan Zainal Abidin of Terengganu, Yang di-Pertuan Agong of Malaysia
1964 – Nigel Benn, English-Australian boxer
  1964   – Stojko Vranković, Croatian basketball player
1965 – Steven Adler, American rock drummer
  1965   – DJ Jazzy Jeff, American DJ and producer
  1965   – Diane Lane, American actress
  1965   – Andrew Roachford, English singer-songwriter and keyboard player
1966 – Craig Salvatori, Australian rugby league player and coach
1968 – Guy Fieri, American chef, author, and television host
  1968   – Heath, Japanese singer-songwriter and bass player
  1968   – Frank Leboeuf, French footballer, sportscaster, and actor
  1968   – Mauricio Serna, Colombian footballer
1969 – Olivia d'Abo, English-American singer-songwriter and actress
  1969   – Keith Gordon, American baseball player and coach
1970 – Jason Lowrie, New Zealand rugby league player and coach
  1970   – Abraham Olano, Spanish cyclist
1971 – Stan Collymore, English footballer and sportscaster
1972 – Terry Hill, Australian rugby league player and coach
1973 – Rogério Ceni, Brazilian footballer
1974 – Cameron McConville, Australian racing driver and sportscaster
  1974   – Joseph Muscat, Maltese journalist and politician, 13th Prime Minister of Malta
1975 – Balthazar Getty, American actor and musician
1976 – Jimmy Anderson, American baseball player and coach
  1976   – James Dearth, American football player
1977 – Mario Domm, Mexican singer-songwriter, pianist, and producer 
  1977   – Anna Linkova, Russian tennis player
  1977   – Hidetoshi Nakata, Japanese footballer
  1977   – Luciano Andrade Rissutt, Brazilian footballer
1978 – Chone Figgins, American baseball player
1979 – Aidan Burley, New Zealand-English politician
  1979   – Carlos Ruiz, Panamanian baseball player
  1979   – Chor Boogie, American artist
1980 – Jonathan Woodgate, English footballer
1981 – Willa Ford, American singer-songwriter, producer, and actress
  1981   – Beverley Mitchell, American actress
  1981   – Ben Moody, American singer-songwriter, guitarist, producer, and actor
  1981   – Ibrahima Sonko, French footballer
1982 – Fabricio Coloccini, Argentine footballer
  1982   – Jason Peters, American football player
1983 – Étienne Bacrot, French chess grandmaster and former chess prodigy
  1983   – Shaun Cody, American football player
1984 – Ben Eager, Canadian ice hockey player
  1984   – Ubaldo Jiménez, Dominican baseball player
  1984   – Leon Powe, American basketball player
  1984   – Maceo Rigters, Dutch footballer
1985 – Fotios Papoulis, Greek footballer
  1985   – Yan Xu, Singaporean table tennis player
1986 – Maher Magri, Tunisian footballer
  1986   – Matt Simon, Australian footballer
1987 – Astrid Jacobsen, Norwegian skier
  1987   – Shane Long, Irish footballer
  1987   – Ray Rice, American football player
1988 – Asher Allen, American football player
  1988   – Greg Oden, American basketball player
  1988   – Marcel Schmelzer, German footballer
1989 – Theo Robinson, English footballer
1990 – Alizé Cornet, French tennis player
  1990   – Dean Whare, New Zealand rugby league player
  1990   – Logic, American rapper
  1990   – Phil Wang, Malaysian comedian
1991 – Stefan Kolb, German footballer
1996 – Joshua Ho-Sang, Canadian ice hockey player 
  1996   – Kumi Sasaki, Japanese idol
1997 – Fan Zhendong, Chinese table tennis player
1998 – Silento, American rapper, singer and songwriter 
2000 – Laia Codina, Spanish footballer

Deaths

Pre-1600
 239 – Cao Rui, Chinese emperor (b. 205)
 628 – Anastasius of Persia, monk
 906 – He, empress of the Tang Dynasty
 935 – Ma, empress of Southern Han
1001 – Al-Muqallad ibn al-Musayyab, Uqaylid emir of Mosul
1051 – Ælfric Puttoc, archbishop of York
1170 – Wang Chongyang, Chinese Daoist and co-founder of the Quanzhen School (b. 1113)
1188 – Ferdinand II of León (b. 1137)
1341 – Louis I, Duke of Bourbon (b. 1279)
1517 – Hadım Sinan Pasha, Ottoman politician, 32nd Grand Vizier of the Ottoman Empire (b. ?)
1536 – Bernhard Knipperdolling, German religious leader (b. 1495)
  1536   – John of Leiden, Anabaptist leader from the Dutch city of Leiden (b. 1509)
1552 – Edward Seymour, 1st Duke of Somerset, English general and politician, Lord High Treasurer of England (b. 1500)
1560 – Wang Zhi, Chinese pirate
1575 – James Hamilton, Duke of Châtellerault (b. 1516)
1599 – Cristofano Malvezzi, Italian organist and composer (b. 1547)

1601–1900
1666 – Shah Jahan, Mughal emperor (b. 1592)
1750 – Franz Xaver Josef von Unertl, Bavarian politician (b. 1675)
1763 – John Carteret, 2nd Earl Granville, English politician, Lord Lieutenant of Ireland (b. 1690)
1767 – Johann Gottlob Lehmann, German meteorologist and geologist (b. 1719)
1779 – Jeremiah Dixon, English surveyor and astronomer (b. 1733)
  1779   – Claudius Smith, American guerrilla leader (b. 1736)
1798 – Lewis Morris, American judge and politician (b. 1726)
1840 – Johann Friedrich Blumenbach, German physician, physiologist, and anthropologist (b. 1752)
1850 – Vincent Pallotti, Italian missionary and saint (b. 1795)
1879 – Anthony Durnford, Irish colonel (b. 1830)
  1879   – Henry Pulleine, English colonel (b. 1838)
1892 – Joseph P. Bradley, American lawyer and jurist (b. 1813)
1900 – David Edward Hughes, Welsh-American physicist, co-invented the microphone (b. 1831)

1901–present
1901 – Queen Victoria of the United Kingdom (b. 1819)
1909 – Emil Erlenmeyer, German chemist and academic (b. 1825)
1921 – George Streeter, American captain and businessman (b. 1837)
1922 – Fredrik Bajer, Danish educator and politician, Nobel Prize laureate (b. 1837)
  1922   – Pope Benedict XV (b. 1854)
  1922   – Camille Jordan, French mathematician and academic (b. 1838)
1925 – Fanny Bullock Workman, American geographer and mountain climber (b. 1859)
1927 – James Ford Rhodes, American historian and author (b. 1848)
1929 – R. C. Lehmann, English journalist, author, and politician (b. 1856)
1930 – Stephen Mather, American businessman and conservationist, co-founded the Thorkildsen-Mather Borax Company (b. 1867)
1931 – László Batthyány-Strattmann, Hungarian physician and ophthalmologist (b. 1870)
1945 – Else Lasker-Schüler, German poet and playwright (b. 1869)
1949 – William Thomas Walsh, American author, poet, and playwright (b. 1891)
1950 – Alan Hale, Sr., American actor and director (b. 1892)
1951 – Harald Bohr, Danish mathematician and footballer (b. 1887)
  1951   – Lawson Robertson, Scottish-American sprinter and high jumper (b. 1883)
1955 – Jonni Myyrä, Finnish-American athlete (b. 1892)
1957 – Ralph Barton Perry, American philosopher and academic (b. 1876)
1959 – Mike Hawthorn, English race car driver (b. 1929)
1964 – Marc Blitzstein, American pianist and composer (b. 1905)
1966 – Herbert Marshall, English actor (b. 1890)
1968 – Duke Kahanamoku, American swimmer and water polo player (b. 1890)
1971 – Harry Frank Guggenheim, American businessman and publisher, co-founded Newsday (b. 1890)
1973 – Lyndon B. Johnson, American lieutenant and politician, 36th President of the United States (b. 1908)
1975 – Andrew George Burry, Swiss-American businessman and philanthropist (b. 1873)
1977 – Ibrahim bin Abdullah Al Suwaiyel, Saudi Arabian diplomat (b. 1916)
1978 – Oliver Leese, English general (b. 1894)
  1978   – Herbert Sutcliffe, English cricketer and soldier (b. 1894)
1979 – Ali Hassan Salameh, Palestinian rebel leader (b. 1940)
1980 – Yitzhak Baer, German-Israeli historian and academic (b. 1888)
1981 – Ishtiaq Hussain Qureshi, Pakistani historian and academic (b. 1903)
1982 – Eduardo Frei Montalva, Chilean lawyer and politician, 28th President of Chile (b. 1911)
1985 – Arthur Bryant, English historian and journalist (b. 1899)
1987 – R. Budd Dwyer, American educator and politician, 30th Treasurer of Pennsylvania (b. 1939)
1989 – S. Vithiananthan, Sri Lankan author and academic (b. 1924)
1991 – Robert Choquette, Canadian author, poet and diplomat (b. 1905)
1993 – Kōbō Abe, Japanese playwright and photographer (b. 1924)
1994 – Jean-Louis Barrault, French actor and director (b. 1910)
  1994   – Telly Savalas, American actor (b. 1922)
1996 – Israel Eldad, Polish-Israeli philosopher and author (b. 1910)
1997 – Billy Mackenzie, Scottish singer-songwriter (b. 1957)
1999 – Graham Staines, Australian-Indian missionary and translator (b. 1941)
2000 – Craig Claiborne, American journalist, author, and critic (b. 1920)
  2000   – Anne Hébert, Canadian author and poet (b. 1916)
2001 – Tommie Agee, American baseball player (b. 1942)
  2001   – Roy Brown, American clown and puppeteer (b. 1932)
2003 – Bill Mauldin, American soldier and cartoonist (b. 1921)
2004 – Billy May, American trumpet player and composer (b. 1916)
  2004   – Tom Mead, Australian journalist and politician (b. 1918)
  2004   – Ann Miller, American actress, singer, and dancer (b. 1923)
2005 – César Gutiérrez, Venezuelan baseball player, coach, and manager (b. 1943)
  2005   – Carlo Orelli, Italian soldier (b. 1894)
  2005   – Consuelo Velázquez, Mexican pianist and songwriter (b. 1924)
2006 – Aydın Güven Gürkan, Turkish academic and politician, Turkish Minister of Labor and Social Security (b. 1941)
2007 – Ngô Quang Trưởng, Vietnamese general (b. 1929)
  2007   – Abbé Pierre, French priest and activist (b. 1912)
  2007   – Liz Renay, American actress, author and performer (b. 1926)
2008 – Heath Ledger, Australian actor and director (b. 1979)
  2008   – Miles Lerman, Polish Holocaust survivor and activist (b. 1920)
2009 – Billy Werber, American baseball player (b. 1908)
2010 – Louis R. Harlan, American historian and author (b. 1922)
  2010   – Jean Simmons, English-American actress (b. 1929)
2012 – Simon Marsden, English photographer and author (b. 1948)
  2012   – Joe Paterno, American football player and coach (b. 1926)
  2012   – Clarence Tillenius, Canadian painter and environmentalist (b. 1913)
  2012   – Dick Tufeld, American actor, announcer, narrator and voice actor (b. 1926)
2013 – Robert Bonnaud, French historian and academic (b. 1929)
  2013   – Hinton Mitchem, American businessman and politician (b. 1938)
2014 – Maziar Partow, Iranian cinematographer (b. 1933)
2015 – Fabrizio de Miranda, Italian engineer and academic, co-designed the Rande Bridge (b. 1926)
  2015   – Wendell H. Ford, American lieutenant and politician, 53rd Governor of Kentucky (b. 1924)
  2015   – Margaret Bloy Graham, Canadian author and illustrator (b. 1920)
2016 – Homayoun Behzadi, Iranian footballer and coach (b. 1942)
  2016   – Cecil Parkinson, English politician (b. 1931)
  2016   – Lois Ramsey, Australian actress (b. 1922)
  2016   – Kamer Genç, Turkish politician (b. 1940)
2017 – Masaya Nakamura, Japanese businessman (b. 1925)
  2017   – Yordano Ventura, Dominican baseball player (b. 1991)
2018 – Ursula K. Le Guin, American sci-fi and fantasy novelist (b. 1929)
  2018   – William B. Jordan, American art historian (b. 1940)
2021 – Hank Aaron, American baseball player (b. 1934)
2022 – Thích Nhất Hạnh, Vietnamese Thiền Buddhist monk, peace activist, and founder of the Plum Village Tradition (b. 1926)

Holidays and observances
Christian feast day:
Anastasius of Persia
Gaudentius of Novara
László Batthyány-Strattmann
Laura Vicuna
Vincent Pallotti
Vincent of Saragossa
Vincent, Orontius, and Victor
Blessed William Joseph Chaminade
January 22 (Eastern Orthodox liturgics)
Day of Unity of Ukraine (Ukraine)
Grandfather's Day (Poland)

References

External links

 BBC: On This Day
 
 Historical Events on January 22

Days of the year
January